David Copperfield is a 2000 American-Irish made-for-television film adaptation of Charles Dickens's 1850 novel of the same name. It was filmed in Ireland, and broadcast on TNT as a Hallmark Entertainment production on 10–11 December 2000.

Plot
The film centres on the journey of David Copperfield, from experiencing an impoverished and miserable childhood to becoming a successful and famous author (for more detail, see David Copperfield (novel)).

Cast

Production

Writing
The plot follows relatively closely to that of the book, although the film highly condenses Steerforth's liaison with Emily and the Peggotty family to primarily off-screen action, as in the 1935 version, and omitting the famous "tempest" scene.  An extra plotline placing emphasis on the Murdstone siblings is also included, so that David is tormented by their appearance throughout his life, and eventually violently confronts them near the ending, a scene not present in the book.  Some scenes are simplified as well; for instance, Uriah Heep's cunning and complex embezzlement scheme from the book is changed to a very simple plotline involving stolen diamonds.  However, this film stresses the relationship between David, Agnes, and Uriah much more than in previous adaptations.

Reception

Critical reception
The film is generally well received by viewers and critics alike, earning a 7/10 stars from IMDB, although some viewers dislike the straying from the book's plot material, and some critics feel Hugh Dancy gave a weak performance in the title role.  Most criticism stems from the choice of American actors Sally Field and Michael Richards, portraying the classic roles of Betsey Trotwood and Wilkins Micawber, though Field was a last-minute replacement for Angela Lansbury.

External links

2000 television films
2000 films
2000 drama films
American drama television films
Films directed by Peter Medak
Irish television films
Films based on David Copperfield
Television shows based on David Copperfield
TNT Network original films
English-language Irish films
2000s American films